Carlo Croce may refer to:

 Carlo Croce (soldier) (1892–1944), Italian soldier and Resistance member during World War II
 Carlo M. Croce (born 1944), Italian medical doctor
 Carlo Croce (sailor) (born 1945), Italian yacht racer